Gramella planctonica is a Gram-negative, strictly aerobic, non-spore-forming and rod-shaped bacterium from the genus of Gramella.

References

Flavobacteria
Bacteria described in 2014